Donald Keith Ulrich (born April 10, 1944) is a former driver/owner in the NASCAR Winston Cup Series. As a driver, he had sixteen top ten finishes in 273 starts. His last race came in 1992.

As car owner, he fielded cars for many years for young drivers such as Mark Martin, Sterling Marlin, Rick Mast, Greg Sacks, Davy Jones, Parnelli Jones III, Morgan Shepherd, Tim Richmond, Ernie Irvan, and Richard Petty after his number 43 crashed in practice and the team's backup car was not allowed by NASCAR, the Petty team bought Ulrich's No. 6 Chevy and placed STP decals on the previously unsponsored car. Petty would finish 38th after an engine failure. He sold the team to Jasper Motorsports in 1994.

He has two children Tammy Ulrich Langdon and Daniel Keith Ulrich, two grandchildren Truett and Patrick Langdon, and is the stepfather of actor Skeet Ulrich and his brother Geoff Ulrich.

Motorsports career results

NASCAR
(key) (Bold – Pole position awarded by qualifying time. Italics – Pole position earned by points standings or practice time. * – Most laps led.)

Grand National Series

Winston Cup Series

Daytona 500

ARCA Permatex SuperCar Series
(key) (Bold – Pole position awarded by qualifying time. Italics – Pole position earned by points standings or practice time. * – Most laps led.)

References

External links

1944 births
Living people
NASCAR drivers
ARCA Menards Series drivers
NASCAR team owners
Sportspeople from San Bernardino, California
Racing drivers from California